The 2016 KBS Drama Awards, presented by Korean Broadcasting System (KBS), was held on December 31, 2016 at KBS Hall in Yeouido, Seoul. It was hosted by Jun Hyun-moo, Park Bo-gum and  Kim Ji-won.

Winners and nominees
(Winners denoted in bold)

Presenters

Special performances

References

External links
 2016 KBS 연기대상 
 

KBS Drama Awards
KBS Drama Awards
KBS Drama Awards
December 2016 events in South Korea